Marasmarcha pulcher is a moth of the family Pterophoridae. It is found in Turkmenistan, Kazakhstan, Iran and Afghanistan.

The wingspan is 20–22 mm.

References

Moths described in 1885
Exelastini